Priit Tasane (born 16 November 1964) is an Estonian rower. He competed in the men's double sculls event at the 1992 Summer Olympics.

References

1964 births
Living people
Estonian male rowers
Olympic rowers of Estonia
Rowers at the 1992 Summer Olympics
Sportspeople from Pärnu